Artem Kulakovskyi (born 11 February 2002) is a Ukrainian professional footballer who plays as a midfielder for Vorskla Poltava.

Career
Kulakovskyi, who was born in a present day Horishni Plavni, is a product of Metalist Kharkiv and Dynamo Kyiv Youth Sportive School Systems.

In February 2020, he signed a contract with Vorskla Poltava and he made his debut for FC Vorskla main squad in a drawing away game against FC Lviv on 3 July 2020 in the Ukrainian Premier League.

References

External links

2002 births
Living people
People from Horishni Plavni
Ukrainian footballers
Ukraine youth international footballers
Ukraine under-21 international footballers
FC Vorskla Poltava players
FC Hirnyk-Sport Horishni Plavni players
Ukrainian Premier League players
Association football midfielders
Sportspeople from Poltava Oblast